The Lee family is a political family of Singapore, with members in public service, politics, law, and business. The most prominent members of the family are Lee Kuan Yew, the first Prime Minister of Singapore, and his son Lee Hsien Loong, the third and current prime minister.

Other prominent members include:

 Lee Wei Ling, daughter of Lee Kuan Yew: neurologist and former director of the National Neuroscience Institute
 Lee Hsien Yang, son of Lee Kuan Yew: businessman and member of the opposition Progress Singapore Party, was formerly a general and public servant

Family tree

Relation to other prominent families 
Kwa Geok Choo, the wife of Lee Kuan Yew, is the daughter of Wee Yew Neo, who is in turn the sister of Helene Tan, wife of Tan Chin Tuan. The Tan's are another prominent family in Singapore, whose members include Tony Tan, the 7th President of Singapore, Tan Kim Seng, a Peranakan businessman, and Mr and Mrs Tan Eng Sian, who the College of Alice and Peter Tan are named after.

References 

 
Business families of Singapore
Political families of Singapore
Politics of Singapore